Percy Cummings (born 5 September 1946) is a former Australian rules football player who played five games for Hawthorn Football Club.

Cummings is the grandson of Joe Johnson, the first recognised Indigenous Australian to play in the VFL/AFL.

References

External links
 
 

1946 births
Living people
Hawthorn Football Club players
Indigenous Australian players of Australian rules football
Australian rules footballers from Victoria (Australia)
Place of birth missing (living people)